Felipe Florencio da Silva (born 19 February 2002), known as Felipe Silva or just Lipe, is a Brazilian footballer who plays as a central defender for Avaí.

Club career
Born in Florianópolis, Santa Catarina, Lipe was an Avaí youth graduate. He made his first team debut on 19 February 2022, starting in a 2–1 Campeonato Catarinense home win over Concórdia.

On 21 March 2022, Lipe renewed his contract until 2025. He made his Série A debut on 5 November, starting in a 1–1 away draw against Santos.

Career statistics

References

External links
Avaí profile 

2002 births
Living people
Sportspeople from Florianópolis
Brazilian footballers
Association football defenders
Campeonato Brasileiro Série A players
Avaí FC players